Midnight is a 1989 American thriller-horror film written and directed  by Norman Thaddeus Vane and starring Lynn Redgrave and Tony Curtis.

Plot

The sultry midnight, late-night horror movie hostess, has the highest rated show on TV. Mr. B is scheming to steal the rights to the show. The tug of war begins and soon escalates into a deadly conflict.

Cast 

 Lynn Redgrave as Midnight
 Tony Curtis as Mr. B 
 Steve Parrish as Mickey Modine
 Karen Witter as Missy Angel  
 Frank Gorshin as Ron Saphier
 Robert Miano as Arnold
 Rita Gam as Heidi
  Gustav Vintas as Siegfried
 Wolfman Jack as himself 
 Robert Axelrod as Ozzie
  Nathan Le Grand as Hank
 Barry Diamond as Wally  
  Ron Max as Detective
 Tommy 'Tiny' Lister as Security Guard  
 Kathleen Kinmont as Party

References

External links 

1980s horror thriller films
American horror thriller films
1980s English-language films